Winfield City School District is a school district located in Marion County, Alabama.

Winfield City Schools consist of Winfield Elementary School, Winfield Middle School, and Winfield High School.

Winfield City Schools is the first school district to have all of its schools STEM certified and accredited.

The school district has 1,280 students in grades preK to K-12 with a student-teacher ratio of 16 to 1. According to state test scores, 58% of students are at least proficient in math and 53% in reading.

References

External links
 

Education in Marion County, Alabama